Fresh Hits 98 is a compilation album released in 1998. As a part of the Hits compilation series, it contains UK hit singles from the spring and summer months of 1998. The album reached number 1 on the UK compilations chart and stayed there for six weeks.

Track listing

Disc one
 B*Witched - "C'est la Vie"
 Five - "Got the Feelin'"
 The Tamperer featuring Maya - "Feel It"
 Celine Dion - "My Heart Will Go On (Tony Moran Mix)"
 Wyclef Jean - "Gone till November"
 Busta Rhymes - "Turn It Up (Remix)/Fire It Up (Clean)"
 Dario G - "Carnaval de Paris"
 Steps - "Last Thing on My Mind"
 Cleopatra - "Life Ain't Easy"
 Aqua - "Doctor Jones"
 Lutricia McNeal - "Stranded"
 Ultra Naté - "Found a Cure"
 Alexia - "Gimme Love"
 Ultra - "Say it Once"
 Bus Stop featuring Carl Douglas - "Kung Fu Fighting"
 Dana International - "Diva"
 Tina Moore - "Nobody Better"
 Robyn - "Do You Really Want Me (Show Respect)"
 Will Mellor - "No Matter What I Do"
 Baddiel, Skinner and Lightning Seeds - "Three Lions '98"

Disc two
 Robbie Williams - "Let Me Entertain You"
 Natalie Imbruglia - "Wishing I Was There"
 Catatonia - "Road Rage"
 Kula Shaker - "Sound of Drums"
 Tin Tin Out featuring Shelley Nelson - "Here's Where the Story Ends"
 Simply Red - "Say You Love Me"
 The Corrs - "Dreams (Tee's Radio)"
 Rod Stewart - "Ooh La La"
 Billie Myers - "Kiss the Rain"
 Lighthouse Family - "High"
 All Saints - "Never Ever"
 Super Furry Animals - "Ice Hockey Hair"
 Freak Power - "No Way"
 Tzant - "Sounds of the Wickedness"
 Missy Elliott featuring 702 and Magoo - "Beep Me 911"
 Aretha Franklin - "A Rose Is Still a Rose"
 Mase featuring Total - "What You Want"
 Jay-Z featuring Blackstreet - "The City Is Mine"
 N.Y.C.C. - "Fight For Your Right (To Party)"
 187 Lockdown - "Kung Fu"

External links
 Discogs entry for Fresh Hits 98

1998 compilation albums
Hits (compilation series) albums